Emerson Bueno dos Santos (born June 15, 1980 in Bom Jardim de Goiás), or simply Goiano, is a Brazilian right back  for Paraná in the Brazilian Série A.

Honours
Paraná State League: 1997
Brazilian League (2nd division): 2000

Contract
1 April 2007 to 31 December 2008

External links

CBF
placar

1980 births
Living people
Brazilian footballers
Paraná Clube players
Association football defenders